Country Code: +688
International Call Prefix: 00

Landlines

The local telephone numbers in Tuvalu are five digits long with no leading trunk zero to be omitted by international callers.  The first two digits relate to the Tuvalu island in which is being called.  The remaining three digits are for the local number; however, when calling within the same island, all five digits must be dialled.

Atoll codes

Each of the nine atolls (districts) of Tuvalu has a dialing code, apart from Funafuti which has two.

 20 Funafuti
 21 Funafuti
 22 Niulakita
 23 Nui (atoll)
 24 Nukufetau
 25 Nukulaelae
 26 Nanumea
 27 Nanumaga
 28 Niutao
 29 Vaitupu

Mobile telephones
90: Mobile (prepaid)
WNP:

The mobile network was destroyed in a storm in 2007, and rebuilt in 2009.

Other numbers

The telephone operator can be contacted on 20006 and the emergency services can be contacted on 911.  Tuvalu has generated a lot of revenue from running adult entertainment lines via their country's dialing code  (usually beginning with 62), however due to political and religious reasons they have decided to put a stop to this.

See also 
 Telecommunications in Tuvalu

External links
 ITU data
 Tuvalu dialing information and directory

References

Telephone numbers by country
Communications in Tuvalu